Heceta Head is a headland that stands  above the Pacific Ocean in Lane County, Oregon, United States. The Heceta Head Light is located on its south side.  Heceta Head is named after a Basque explorer under Spanish commission, Bruno de Heceta, who explored the Pacific Northwest in the 1770s. The headland marks the end of a lower-lying stretch of the coastline to the south dominated by sand dunes; the coastline to the north is more varied. Devils Elbow is the bay south of the headland at the mouth of Cape Creek, and with the headland formed Devils Elbow State Park, which is now part of Heceta Head Lighthouse State Scenic Viewpoint.

Historic structures

Heceta Head Light, the assistant lightkeepers’ house, and two bridges located near the headland are listed on the National Register of Historic Places. Cape Creek Bridge carries U.S. 101 across Cape Creek, just south of the headland.

Heceta Head Light, a lighthouse, is  up the headland. Built in 1894, the  lighthouse shines a beam visible for  out to sea, making it the strongest light on the Oregon Coast.

References

External links
Heceta Head Lighthouse State Scenic Viewpoint, at Oregon Parks and Recreation Department

Headlands of Oregon
Oregon Coast
Landforms of Lane County, Oregon